Jain temple, Kundalpur is a complex of six Jain temples located in Kundalpur village near Nalanda, Bihar. Kundalpur is one of the most important Jain pilgrimages in Bihar.

History
Kundalpur was an ancient capital city ruled by the Licchavi. Kundalpur is believed to be the birthplace of Mahavira, the 24th tirthankara of Jainism. This place is also believed to birthplace of four of the eleven Ganadhara of Mahavira, including Gautama Swami.

Architecture 
The ancient Jain temple called Simhamukhi Teela is located near Nalanda and houses a  idol of Mahavira. The temple houses a number of Jain artifacts. The temple is constructed using stones from Jaisalmer housing idols of Mahavira, Rishabhanatha and Gautama Swami. In Kundalpur temple complex, a total of 72 idols of Tirthankaras are installed in a separate temples.

The temple also has a dharamshala equipped with all modern facilities, including Bhojanalaya (a restaurant).

Kundalpur is one of the most important Jain pilgrimage centres of Bihar and proposed to be developed as part of the Jain circuit.

Gallery

Festival 
Kundalpur Mahotsav is the main festival celebrated in here, the event is organised on the day of Mahavir Janma Kalyanak.

See also 
 Pawapuri
 Rajgir

References

Citation

Sources

External links

Jain temples in Bihar
21st-century Jain temples